Oliveira do Douro is a Portuguese parish in the municipality of Vila Nova de Gaia. The population in 2011 was 22,383, in an area of 7.54 km².

References

Freguesias of Vila Nova de Gaia